Jason Erba (born 1 January 1972) is an Australian former professional rugby league footballer who played in the 1990s.

Playing career
Originally from Ingham, Erba represented the Queensland under-17 side in 1989 and the Queensland under-19 side in 1990 and 1991.

After playing for Herbert River in the Foley Shield, Erba made his first grade debut for the Brisbane Broncos in Round 20 of the 1992 NSWRL season. After leaving the Broncos, Erba spent time with the Gold Coast Seagulls but did not play first grade for the club.

In 1995, he played for the newly-established North Queensland Cowboys, playing five games for them in their inaugural season. In 1997, Erba played for the Sheffield Eagles in the Super League.

Post-playing career
Following his retirement, Erba returned to Ingham to coach the Herbert River Crushers A-Grade side.

References

1972 births
Living people
Australian rugby league players
Brisbane Broncos players
North Queensland Cowboys players
Rugby league hookers
Rugby league players from Queensland
Sheffield Eagles players